The Old U.S. Post Office in Philadelphia, Mississippi was built in 1936. It is a structure of historical significance, being one of 32 federal post offices built in Mississippi during the Great Depression as part of U.S. President Franklin Roosevelt's New Deal public buildings program. The building was listed on the National Register of Historic Places on June 30, 1995. The building currently houses the Philadelphia police department.

References

External links

Post office buildings on the National Register of Historic Places in Mississippi
National Register of Historic Places in Neshoba County, Mississippi
Government buildings completed in 1935
Neoclassical architecture in Mississippi
Philadelphia, Mississippi